Number Ones is a video album by American recording artist Michael Jackson. It was released on DVD on November 13, 2003 under the Epic Records record label, in conjunction with the promotion for Jackson's greatest hits album, of the same name (although the album and DVD have different songs). The DVD, which is Jackson's fourth DVD album, contained fifteen music videos, which were directed and produced by various people. It consists of music videos filmed and released by Jackson from 1979's Off the Wall to 2001's Invincible. As with the album, the DVD has four different covers.

Notable music videos included on the DVD were "Beat It", "Billie Jean" and Thriller—which received heavy rotation on MTV in the 1980s, and are credited as having transformed the music video from a promotional tool and into an art form, and "Black or White" which was also prominent on channels like MTV in the 1990s. Number Ones received praise from contemporary music critics and was commercially successful internationally. The DVD peaked at number one on the Australian Top 40 Music DVD in Australia. Number Ones has been certified twenty two times platinum in Australia by the Australian Recording Industry Association and is the best selling music DVD ever by a male solo artist in Australia. It is also thirteen times platinum in the United States by the Recording Industry Association of America.

Background
In 1972, while still a member of the band The Jackson 5, Michael Jackson released his first of what would be ten studio albums, Got to Be There. Four singles were taken from the album, although they were not promoted by music videos, and this pattern continued for his next three studio albums, Ben (1972), Music & Me (1973) and Forever, Michael (1975). Unlike in the past, Jackson released his debut music video for the lead single, "Don't Stop 'Til You Get Enough", from his 1979 album, Off the Wall. Jackson subsequently began releasing music videos for his singles to promote both the song itself and the album. His music videos from the 1980s — particularly the music videos for "Billie Jean" and Thriller — received heavy rotation on channels like Music Television (MTV). The popularity of his music videos that aired on MTV, such as "Beat It", "Billie Jean" and Thriller — credited for transforming the music video from a promotional tool and into an art form — helped bring the relatively new channel to fame. Music videos such as "Black or White" made Jackson an enduring staple on MTV in the 1990s. Some of them drew criticism for their violent and sexual content, others were lauded by critics and awarded Guinness World Records for their length, success and expense. From 1979 to 2003, Jackson released thirty-six music videos.

Content and release
Number Ones was released in conjunction with Jackson's greatest number one hits of the same name on November 18, 2003. The DVD was released worldwide on November 13, 2003. Number Ones is the fourth DVD album to be released by Jackson, the previous three were Dangerous – The Short Films, Video Greatest Hits – HIStory and HIStory on Film, Volume II. The DVD contained ninety one minutes of music video Jackson had already released from as early as 1979, to as late as 2001. This compilation was also released in Asia on double Video CD format.

Music videos from Jackson's Sony studio albums, which were Off the Wall (1979), Thriller (1982), Bad (1987), Dangerous (1991), HIStory: Past, Present and Future, Book I (1995), Blood on the Dance Floor: HIStory in the Mix (1997) and Invincible (2001), were featured on the DVD. The DVD consisted of fifteen music videos, both long and short form versions. "I Just Can't Stop Loving You" (1987), "Break of Dawn" (2001), the then newly recorded "One More Chance" (2003) and a live version of "Ben" (1972) did not make it onto the DVD (while no music videos were shot for the first two singles, the music video for "One More Chance" would later be released in Michael Jackson's Vision), while "Blood on the Dance Floor" (1997), which was on the DVD, was not on the American version of the album of the same name, same with "Man in the Mirror" for the international version of the album.

Reception

Commercial reception
Number Ones peaked at number one the ARIA Top 40 Music DVD chart in Australia. It was ranked at number two, charting behind only Funhouse Tour: Live In Australia by Pink, on the Australian Highest Selling Music DVD chart for 2009. It also peaked at number three on the Swedish DVD Albums Chart. In Czech Republic, Number Ones peaked at number fourteen on the DVD chart. Number Ones peaked at number three on the Hungarian Top 20 DVD chart. In Italy, Number Ones peaked at number nine on the country's DVD album chart, as of the first week of May 2010, it has stayed on the chart for forty five weeks. The DVD album was certified thirteen times platinum by the Recording Industry Association of America for the sales of over 1.3 million units in the United States. Number Ones was also certified twenty two times platinum by the Australian Recording Industry Association for the sales of over 330,000 units in Australia. Recording Industry Association of Japan certified the DVD gold for the sales of over 100,000 units in Japan. For the sales of over 25,000 units in Spain, Productores de Música de España gave the album two times platinum certification. Number Ones was also certified six times platinum for the sales of 30,000 units in New Zealand, as well as gold by the Polish Society of the Phonographic Industry for the sales of at least 5,000 units in Poland.

Critical reception

Number Ones was generally well received by contemporary music critics. William Ruhlmann, a writer for Allmusic, stated that watching the videos in order made him 'experience' Jackson's changing appearance over the year; noting things such as Jackson's skin becoming lighter (a result of his Vitiligo). Ruhlmann commented that seeing Jackson's changing appearance, as well as the videos itself helped him understand Jackson's career more, commenting, "Number Ones was released at what appeared to be the end of Michael Jackson's long, troubled reign as a pop star, and it contained many clues to both his success and his downfall." Ruhlmann further noted that "a messianic theme ran through many of the videos"  like the relatively modest "Beat It," which is about stopping violence, to "Earth Song," in which Jackson restored ravaged rain forests and even brought the dead back to life. Dan LeLuca of the Philadelphia Inquirer described Number Ones as being a "reminder" of the "MTV era". Jeff Mires of News Pop Music Critic felt that the release of both the Number Ones CD and DVD was a good opportunity to "revisit Jackson's music".

Track listing and formats

Notes:
  The short version of the music video is featured on Number Ones.
  The “sped-up” version of the video is featured on Number Ones.
  "Don't Stop 'Til You Get Enough", "Smooth Criminal", and "Blood on the Dance Floor" were excluded on the Chinese version.

Formats
The DVD album has been released in one version, as a one disc release.
 Keep case — DVD size packaging
The video was also available on double Video CD (in the Asian market only). In 2006, it was also released as a UMD video for the Sony PSP.

Chart performance

Certifications

Charts

Personnel
Credits

 Michael Jackson – vocals, producer, executive producer, video director
 Julian Alexander – art direction
 Steve Barron – video director
 Bill Bottrell – producer
 Nicholas Brandt – video director
 Rance Brown – art direction, design
 Colin Chilvers – video director
 David Daoud Coleman – art direction
 Nancy Donald – art direction
 Sam Emerson – photography
 Karen Faye – make-up, hair stylist
 David Foster – producer
 Bob Giraldi – video director
 Bruce Gowers – video director
 Stephen Harvey – photography

 Wayne Isham – video director
 Rodney Jerkins – producer
 Quincy Jones – producer
 R. Kelly – producer ("You Are Not Alone")
 John Landis – video director
 Sheri G. Lee – art direction
 John McClain – executive producer
 Adam Owett – art direction
 Vince Peterson – video director
 Joe Pytka – video director
 Seth Riggs – vocal consultant
 Nick Saxton – video director
 Martin Scorsese – video director
 Don Wilson – video director
 Dick Zimmerman – photography

Notes

Bibliography

George, Nelson (2004). Michael Jackson: The Ultimate Collection booklet. Sony BMG.

External links
 The official website for Michael Jackson

2003 video albums
Michael Jackson video albums
Music video compilation albums